Two warships of Japan have borne the name Yūgumo:
, a  launched in 1941 and sunk in 1943
, a  launched in 1977 and struck in 2005

Japanese Navy ship names